Isopachys roulei, also known as the Chonburi snake skink, is a species of limbless skink. It is endemic to Thailand and known from Chonburi and Nakhon Ratchasima Provinces.

References

Isopachys
Reptiles of Thailand
Endemic fauna of Thailand
Reptiles described in 1920
Taxa named by Fernand Angel